Ian Coulson (born 5 April 1980) is a Zimbabwean cricketer. He played eleven first-class matches between 2000 and 2003.

See also
 CFX Academy cricket team

References

External links
 

1980 births
Living people
Zimbabwean cricketers
CFX Academy cricketers
Manicaland cricketers
Midlands cricketers
Sportspeople from Bulawayo